Thomas Blezard (November 24, 1838 – April 19, 1902) was an Ontario political figure.

Career
He represented Peterborough East in the Legislative Assembly of Ontario as a Liberal member from 1879 to 1902.

Early life
He was born in Otonabee Township, Peterborough County, Upper Canada in 1838.

Personal life
In 1865, he married Mary Meikle. He served on the township council for nine years and the county council for five years.

Dedication
Blezard Valley near Sudbury was named after him.

External links 
The Canadian parliamentary companion, 1891 JA Gemmill

1838 births
1902 deaths
Ontario Liberal Party MPPs